Waiuna Lagoon is a lake in the Southland Region of New Zealand's South Island, just inland from Big Bay. It is 15 metres above sea level, and is drained by the Awarua River.

References 

Lakes of Fiordland